The Atlantic Provinces Chambers of Commerce (APCC) is a regional chamber of commerce in the four Atlantic Provinces of Canada. APCC is an alliance of local chambers of commerce and boards of trade throughout Atlantic Canada. Formed in 1896 as the Maritime Board of Trade (MBT) it was created by 10 local boards of trade in the three Maritime Provinces of Canada. In 1975 the Newfoundland Board of Trade joined with the MBT and the organization changed its name to APCC. Incorporated in New Brunswick the head office remains in Moncton, N.B. but the executive and administrative office is now located in Kentville, N.S.

External links
 Atlantic Provinces Chambers of Commerce website

Chambers of commerce in Canada
Organizations established in 1896